River Cottage Forever is the third in the "River Cottage" Channel 4 series franchise, following on from Escape to River Cottage and Return to River Cottage in which chef and journalist Hugh Fearnley-Whittingstall de-camped from the rat-race of city living to move to the rolling hills of the Dorset countryside, which provided the perfect backdrop for his experiment to live off the fat of the land in as self-sufficient a style as possible, tucked away at the bottom of one of the Dorset valleys is the ideal home: River Cottage.

In his first year Fearnley-Whittingstall had just the cottage and the garden but he soon found he needed more land. In his second year he negotiated a deal with a neighbour to rent four acres (≃16,200 m²). His smallholding now boasted a polytunnel for growing vegetables, a fox-proof high rise chicken accommodation and a pasture for his sheep, cows and pigs.

List of episodes

External links

Channel 4 original programming
2002 British television series debuts
2002 British television series endings